Harworth Bircotes or Harworth and Bircotes is a town and civil parish in the Bassetlaw district of Nottinghamshire in the East Midlands of England. The parish includes the settlements of Bircotes and Harworth. The parish was created on 1 April 1974 out of Harworth parish.

Harworth and Bircotes Town Council is the lowest tier of local government.

References

External links
Harworth Colliery - Miner's Advice Information Template
Town Council website
Harworth & Bircotes Neighbourhood Development Plan 2015 – 2028
Understanding Harworth & Bircotes: Harworth & Bircotes Neighbourhood Development Plan 2014 - 2028

Towns in Nottinghamshire
Civil parishes in Nottinghamshire
Bassetlaw District